Syntrophobacter sulfatireducens is a species of bacteria notable for degrading propionate. It is notable for being syntrophic and for oxidising propionate. Its cells are egg-shaped. TB8106T (=AS 1.5016T=DSM 16706T) is its type strain.

References

External links
 J.P. Euzéby: List of Prokaryotic names with Standing in Nomenclature

Type strain of Syntrophobacter sulfatireducens at BacDive -  the Bacterial Diversity Metadatabase

Thermodesulfobacteriota
Bacteria described in 2005